Parliamentary elections were held in Brazil on 3 October 1958. Voter turnout was 92%.

Results

Chamber of Deputies

Senate

References

General elections in Brazil
Brazil
Legislative
Brazil
Election and referendum articles with incomplete results